Alessandro II Pico della Mirandola (Mirandola, 30 March 1631 – Concordia sulla Secchia, 2 February 1691) was an Italian nobleman, soldier and patron of the arts, second Duke of Mirandola and third Marquis of Concordia from 1637 until his death.

Life 
Son of Galeotto IV and Maria Cybo-Malaspina (1609-1652), daughter of Carlo I Cybo-Malaspina, prince of Massa e marquis of Carrara. On 2 September 1637, at the age of 6, he inherited by her grandfather Alexander I's will the dominion of the Duchy of Mirandola, receiving confirmation of the investiture in 1641 from Emperor Ferdinand III. Due to his young age, the regency was entrusted to his mother and aunt Maria (1613-1682), who relinquished guardianship in 1648.

In 1666, at the Duchy of Milan, he was in the service of King Charles II of Spain, who knighted him with the Golden Fleece. At the request of Pope Clement IX, he left Mirandola to Venice, from where he set sail the following month for the island of Crete with 9 warships and 3,000 soldiers. After a stopover in Zakynthos, he landed in Candia on 23 August 1669 and joined the French, papal and Venetian forces in the Cretan War against the Ottomans, who had been besieging the Greek city for over twenty years. Alessandro II Pico was appointed field master of the papal troops. However, on 5 September 1669, the defenders of Candia had to sign the surrender to the Turks and were given the honours of war. Alessandro, suffering from malaria, returned to Mirandola where he was triumphantly welcomed.

He was a prince who loved the arts and had the church of Gesù e the church of the Servants of Mary. He had a library and an art gallery set up, modernised the castle of the Pico family, and paved all the streets of Mirandola. Alessandro Pico protected the arts: from painting (worthy of note is the gallery frescoed by Biagio Falcieri for the rich picture gallery that he set up through costly purchases) to music, calling Giovanni Battista Bassani to court. Finally, Alessandro tried to obtain the investiture of Mirandola as a bishopric, but to no avail.

On 29 April 1656 he married Anna Beatrice d'Este, daughter of Alfonso III , Duke of Modena and Isabella of Savoy, by whom he had nine children, in addition to two natural children.

Upon his death, he left the reign of the Duchy of Mirandola to his young nephew Francesco Maria II, entrusting its management to his sister Brigida Pico.

References

Bibliography 
 
  .

See also 

 Castle of the Pico
 Church of Gesù, Mirandola
 Cretan War (1645–1669)
 Duchy of Mirandola
 Mirandola Mint

Knights of the Golden Fleece
House of Pico
People of the Ottoman–Venetian Wars
Cretan War (1645–1669)